Stay Homas are a Spanish musical trio created as a result of the preventive lockdown to stop the spread of COVID-19 in spring 2020. There are three members in the group: Klaus Stroink (trumpet player in Buhos, Nil Moliner and Horny Section, and voice actor), Guillem Boltó (trombone player and singer in Doctor Prats) and Rai Benet (bass player in Buhos and Nil Moliner). They became roommates in a flat in the Eixample district of Barcelona a few months before the pandemic outbreak. The band's name, Stay Homas, is a play on words with the expression “stay home”.

History

Early days 
Their first song, Confainament I, was uploaded to Benet's Instagram account on March 14, 2020. The following day, they released their second song, Confainament II, in Boltó's account. Their third one, Del confineo III, was uploaded to Stroink's profile. Given the rapid success of the songs, they decided to create social media accounts with the name of the band. Their songs, recorded in the balcony of their flat, use a humorous tone to talk about the preventive measures against COVID-19, life in self-isolation, and the feeling of frustration from not being able to leave the house. Their songs combine different languages: Catalan, English, Spanish and Portuguese.

The members of the band often invited other musicians to collaborate with them via mobile phone. Some of the cameos were Judit Neddermann, Sílvia Pérez Cruz, Macaco, Nil Moliner, Manu Chao, Oques Grasses, and Sr. Wilson.

The quick spread of their music through social media made them known internationally. They were featured in several media outlets, such as The New Yorker, CNN or NPR. Their songs were covered around the world. Michael Bublé, for instance, adapted Gotta be patient with Barenaked Ladies and Mexican singer Sofía Reyes.

First releases 
In early June 2020, they released the song XXIX: Let it out, the last one before taking a break that coincided with the end of the lockdown in Spain. They recorded three of their songs in a studio and released an EP at the beginning of July, with the title Desconfination. The members of Stay Homas announced in an Instagram Live that their first concert (on July 31, 2020) was sold out in 10 minutes. Given their success, they decided to organize more concerts.

In December 2020 they released their album Agua with Sony Music. Out of the twelve tracks, sis of them were adaptations of songs they had previously sung in their balcony, while the rest of them were new songs. Stay Homas kept the musical eclecticism, multiculturalism and multilingualism that had brought them to fame.

To celebrate their first anniversary and to get ready for their summer tour, Stay Homas released a second batch of songs in March 2021, ten in total. Again from their balcony, they kept their unique style, this time collaborating with Rita Payés, Juanito Makandé, Albert Pla and Rubén Blades.

Agua tour 
The release tour brought the band to forty different locations around Spain. Some of them, like Vida Festival and Canet Rock, were controversial due to a large number of people in attendance even with the alarming results of COVID-19 statistics in Spain. Another important concert was the one in Razzmatazz since it supposed the re-opening of the venue. In December 2021, they are set to visit Milan, Paris, Brussels and London, but their Latin-American tour won't take place until 2022.

Discography 

 Desconfination (EP, 2020).
 Agua (LP, 2020).

Awards 

 ARC Awards 2020:
 Breakout artist
 Innovative project during lockdown
 Enderrock Awards 2021:
 Best pop-rock song, The bright side (amb Oques Grasses)
 Best breakout artist
 Best live performance

References

External links 

 

Musical groups from Catalonia
Catalan music